Leon Valentin Schaffran (born 31 July 1998) is a German professional footballer who plays as a goalkeeper for 2. Bundesliga club Greuther Fürth.

Club career
Schaffran is a youth product of BW Beelitz, RSV Eintracht 1949, and Hertha. He began his senior career with the Hertha reserves in 2016, but left after 3 seasons without breaking into the senior team. He transferred to Greuther Fürth in the summer of 2018, where he was initially the third goalkeeper. He made his professional debut with Greuther Fürth a 2–0 DFB Pokal loss to Stuttgarter Kickers on 30 July 2022. He was briefly the starting goalkeeper in August 2022, after an injury to the starter Andreas Linde.

International career
Schaffran is a youth international for Germany, having played up to the Germany U19s.

References

External links
 
 Bundesliga profile

1998 births
Living people
Footballers from Berlin
German footballers
Germany youth international footballers
Hertha BSC II players
SpVgg Greuther Fürth players
SpVgg Greuther Fürth II players
2. Bundesliga players
Regionalliga players
Association football goalkeepers